The Democratic Party of Socialists of Montenegro (DPS) is a populist political party in Montenegro. A former long-time ruling party sitting at the opposition for the first time as of 2020, it was formed on 22 June 1991 as the successor of the League of Communists of Montenegro, which had governed Montenegro within the Socialist Federal Republic of Yugoslavia since World War II, and has remained a major force in the country ever since. The party is a member of the Socialist International and the Progressive Alliance, and an associate of the Party of European Socialists. During the 1990s, DPS was the major centre-left, social-democratic party in favour of Serbian-Montenegrin unionism. However, since 1997, the party has embraced Montenegrin independence and has been improving ties with the West, slowly turning into a catch-all party embracing Atlanticism, Montenegrin nationalism, neoliberalism, and pro-Europeanism.

Since its formation and the introduction of a multi-party system, the DPS has played a dominant role in Montenegrin politics, forming the backbone of every coalition government until the 2020 parliamentary election, when it entered the opposition. This marked the first time since 1945 that the party, including its predecessor incarnation, had not been in power. Prior to the 2020 election, the party strongly supported the controversial religious freedom law, causing tensions across Montenegro and the rise of the Serbian Orthodox Church in Montenegrin politics. The Church gaining more power gave motivation for the ethnic nationalist faction to rise in the party, with which some members such as the civic nationalist Filip Vujanović had issues since 2011. The ethnic nationalist wing of the party also supported renewing the Montenegrin Orthodox Church, which led to the DPS being accused of creating a "party church".

Ideology 
The party evolved from the League of Communists of Montenegro as a reformist force after Yugoslavia's dissolution. In the 1990s, party was based on democratic socialism, social democracy, and Serbian–Montenegrin unionism. In the 2000s, the party switched policy towards a common state with Serbia and would become the main proponent of the independence of Montenegro in 2006. In the 2010s and 2020s, the party is characterized by populist, big tent politics with a slight centre-left lean, alongside elements of nationalism and a pro-European stance towards European integration. The PDS also followed most mainstream, centre-left, social-democratic parties moving to the right since the 1980s, as a result of the post-war displacement of Keynesianism, by embracing Third Way economics and politics but has been described as one of the most radical neoliberal centre-left parties. Many considered the party and its three decades rule to have been in practice a kleptocratic and authoritarian regime.

After its ninth congress in November 2019, the DPS dominantly increased its ethnic Montenegrin nationalist discourse by officially and institutionally supporting the rights of the canonically unrecognized Montenegrin Orthodox Church, announcing its "re-establishment". According to the ODIHR and Freedom House reports that the party established a hybrid regime as well an electoral authoritarian system. After the fall of its populist regime from the position of power after 30 years due to results of the 2020 Montenegrin parliamentary election, the party said that the Krivokapić Cabinet, a big tent ruling coalition, represents "threat for Montenegrin statehood and its independence". The period before the 2020 parliamentary election was marked by the high polarization of the electorate. Several corruption scandals of the ruling party triggered 2019 Montenegrin anti-corruption protests, while a controversial religion law sparked another wave of protests. Election monitoring observer OSCE stated that "[a]buse of state resources gave the ruling party an unfair advantage" and of inciting ethnic hatred, and said that although the elections were competitive, the governing party also benefited from a lack of independent media. 
In foreign policy, the party maintains Atlanticist and Europeanist positions, condemning Russian aggression against Ukraine and positioning itself in an anti-Russian role.
According to some analysts, the DPS, together with its coallition partners, as well some newly founded nationalist parties, started pushing the narrative of "Montenegro being left to Serbia by the United States and the EU", but these assessments have no foundation in the post-Ukrainian invasion international scenario.

History

Background 

The history of the DPS begins with the political turmoil in Yugoslavia in the late 1980s. After Slobodan Milošević seized power in the League of Communists of Serbia, he went on to organize rallies that eventually ousted the leaderships of the League of Communists of Yugoslavia local branches in Vojvodina, Kosovo, and Montenegro. This series of events, collectively known as the Anti-bureaucratic revolution, swept into power new party leadership in Montenegro, one allied with Milošević, personified in Momir Bulatović, Milo Đukanović, and Svetozar Marović.

Under this new leadership, the League of Communists of Montenegro won by a landslide in the 1990 Montenegrin general election, the first relatively free multi-party election in Socialist Montenegro, held in December 1990, taking 83 out of 125 seats in the Parliament of Montenegro. The party had a significant head start in the elections, as it had the entire established party structure at its disposal, while newly formed competition had to start from scratch. The party changed its name to the Democratic Party of Socialists of Montenegro (Demokratska partija Crne Gore) on 22 June 1991.

With Bulatović as the president, the DPS closely aligned Montenegro with Serbia and the policies of Slobodan Milošević. The party was firmly in power during the turbulent early 1990s, which saw the breakup of Yugoslavia and the beginning of the Yugoslav Wars. During these years, the party endorsed a union and close relations with Serbia, its sole partner in the Federal Republic of Yugoslavia (FRY) from 1992. The party maintained the support of the electorate in this difficult period for Montenegro, winning both the 1992–1993 and 1996 parliamentary elections.

Split between Bulatović and Đukanović 

On July 11, 1997, the party's national committee Glavni odbor (GO) held a closed doors session after which the committee selected Milica Pejanović-Đurišić to replace Bulatović as the party president. The party split had enormous implications, making a political confrontation between Đukanović and Bulatović inevitable. This manifested in the 1997 Montenegrin presidential election held in October, which Đukanović won by a thin margin. Bulatović went on to form the Socialist People's Party of Montenegro (SNP) out of his defeated DPS faction, whose platform held a unionist position on the question of Yugoslavia and its short-lived successor state, Serbia and Montenegro. Meanwhile, Đukanović became a fierce opponent of Slobodan Milošević politics.

As a result of Đukanović's relationship with the United States, Montenegro received significant amounts of economic aid during this period, and negotiated limitations on NATO bombings of its territory in 1999, whereas the rest of Yugoslavia was subject to significantly heavier attacks. The DPS government gradually severed ties with Serbia by taking control over customs and the economy, introducing first the German mark, and subsequently the euro as legal tender, and generally reducing the influence of the federal government in Montenegro.

Montenegrin independence 
Following the overthrow of Slobodan Milošević on 5 October 2000, the DPS showed signs of greater support for Montenegrin independence. The campaign for the 2002 parliamentary elections was devoted to the question of Montenegro's independence. The European Union mediated negotiations between the DPS and the newly elected democratic government in Serbia in 2003 imposed a three-year waiting period before an independence referendum could be held. The transitional period saw the transformation of the FR Yugoslavia to a loose union called Serbia and Montenegro. During the existence of the union state, the party congress added the goal of a "democratic, internationally-recognized, independent Montenegro" to its official platform. The party then spearheaded the pro-independence campaign ahead of Montenegro's referendum in 2006. With 55.5% of voters opting for independence, Montenegro became an independent state on 3 June 2006.

Post-referendum era 

At the 2006 Montenegrin parliamentary election as well as the subsequent 2009 and 2012 parliamentary elections, the DPS confirmed its position as the strongest political party in Montenegro. The party has formed the basis of all parliamentary majorities and has been the backbone of all government cabinets since independence, usually with its now traditional ally the Social Democratic Party of Montenegro and ethnic minority parties. Former party vice-president Filip Vujanović served as the president of Montenegro for three terms from 2002 until 2018, having won presidential elections in 2003, 2008, and 2013, being succeeded by party leader Milo Đukanović in 2018.

Đukanović remains the party president and its undisputed authority, serving either as Prime Minister or President of Montenegro from 1991 to 2006, 2008 to 2010 and 2012 to 2016. In 2006, the party leadership chose Željko Šturanović, former Minister of Justice, to succeed Đukanović as Prime Minister, until his resignation on 31 January 2008 for health reasons, whereupon Đukanović replaced him, only to resign again in December 2010 while retaining his role as DPS party leader. After winning the 2012 parliamentary elections, Đukanović once again assumed the position of Prime Minister. In 2015, the centre-left Social Democratic Party left the coalition with the DPS, accusing ruling party of corruption and abuse of power. At the 2020 parliamentary election, DPS decided to run independently, with single candidate spot on the electoral list given to the nationalist Liberal Party of Montenegro. Election eventually resulted in a victory for the opposition parties and the fall of the authoritarian DPS, after governing the country for 30 years, since the introduction of the multi-party system in 1990.

Party presidents

Electoral performance

Parliamentary elections

Presidential elections

Yugoslavian elections

Positions held

Notes

References

1991 establishments in Montenegro
Full member parties of the Socialist International
Montenegro–European Union relations
Parties related to the Party of European Socialists
Political parties established in 1991
Progressive Alliance
Pro-European political parties in Montenegro
Social democratic parties in Montenegro
Neoliberal parties
Montenegrin nationalism